Martin Gore CBE (February 1951 – 10 January 2019) of the Royal Marsden Hospital was a leading British oncologist. He died of total organ failure after receiving an inoculation against yellow fever.

References

1951 births
2019 deaths
British oncologists
Commanders of the Order of the British Empire
Physicians of the Royal Marsden Hospital
Deaths from multiple organ failure